German Bolivians are Bolivians of full, partial, or predominantly German descent, or German-born people residing in Bolivia.

Waves of immigration

German immigrants began to arrive in Bolivia in the 18th century, and many more arrived in the 19th century.  During World War II, Bolivia ceased diplomatic relations with Germany and expelled many Germans. Many German Jews immigrated to Bolivia during the war. Inti SA, Bolivia's largest pharmaceutical company, was founded by German immigrant Ernesto W. N. Schilling Huhn.

A substantial and growing part of the Germanic population in Bolivia are Plautdietsch-speaking Mennonites from Russia, who are of Dutch and Prussian descent. These Mennonites started to immigrate in the 1950s, with large waves of immigrants in the 1960s and 1970s, mainly from Mexico and Paraguay. In 2012 there were 23,818 church members in congregations of these Mennonites, indicating a total population of about 70,000. The total population of German Mennonites in Bolivia was estimated at 60,000 by Lisa Wiltse in 2010. See also: Mennonites in Bolivia.

Education
German schools:
 Deutsche Schule La Paz
 Deutsche Schule Santa Cruz

Historic German schools:
 Deutsche Schule Oruro
 Deutsche Schule Sucre

Notable German Bolivians 
 Ronald Rivero Kuhn, footballer 
 Hugo Banzer, military officer, twice President
 Germán Busch, military officer and President
 Luciano Durán Böger, writer and poet 
 Enrique Hertzog, physician and President
 Pato Hoffmann, actor and theater director
 Noel Kempff, biologist and environmentalist
 Jaime Mirtenbaum Zenamon, classical guitarist and composer
 Alberto Natusch, military officer and dictator
 Erwin Sánchez Freking, footballer 
 Achim von Kries, German military officer
 Blanca Wiethüchter, writer and poet
 Jorge Wilstermann, aviator
 Lidia Gueiler Tejada, politician (the first female President of Bolivia, and the second woman in the Americas to ever become chief of state).
 Luis Gamarra Mayser, singer and songwriter
 Rodrigo Mendoza Heinrich, American War Hero

See also 
Bolivia–Germany relations
Immigration to Bolivia
Mennonites in Bolivia
History of the Jews in Bolivia

References 

Ethnic groups in Bolivia
 
 
Bolivians
German diaspora in South America
Germans